An electoral alliance of liberal left parties was formed ahead of the 1879 Spanish general election between Práxedes Mateo Sagasta's Constitutional Party (PC), the Democratic Progressive Party (PPD) of Emilio Castelar and Cristino Martos's Possibilist Democratic Party (PD). The alliance was officially launched on 2 April 1879, and would see the fielding of 120 PC candidates, 37 from the PD and 27 from the PPD. The alliance was an electoral failure as it only managed to secure 64 seats, and disbanded shortly thereafter.

References

1879 establishments in Spain
1879 disestablishments in Spain
Defunct political party alliances in Spain